Peter D. Anderson (November 20, 1931 in Southampton, Long Island, New York - February 19, 2013 in Hialeah, Florida) was an American jockey and  Thoroughbred racehorse trainer. He began his riding career in the latter part of the late 1940s and was the leading apprentice jockey in New York in 1948. Like many of his compatriots, Anderson struggled throughout his career to maintain his weight.

Pete Anderson won a number of major Graded stakes races including a victory in the 1966 Washington Park Handicap aboard Bold Bidder in which he defeated the future Hall of Fame inductee, Tom Rolfe.  In the 1973 Kentucky Derby, he rode the great Forego to a fourth-place finish behind eventual Triple Crown champion, Secretariat. In all, he rode Forego in ten starts, earning three wins and a second in the Florida Derby. In his only appearance in the Preakness Stakes, Anderson rode Primate to a fourth-place finish in the 1952 race. However, Anderson's most important career win came in 1958 when he rode Cavan to an upset win over Tim Tam that denied the Calumet Farm colt the Triple Crown.

Following his retirement from riding in the mid-1970s, Pete Anderson remained in the racing business as a trainer. Based at Calder Race Course in Miami Gardens, Florida, in 2007 he was notably the trainer of Delightful Kiss for Hobeau Farm. In June, the gelding won the Ohio Derby, a race that in 1964 Anderson also won as a jockey aboard National.

Pete Anderson's daughter, Aggie Ordonez, is also a Thoroughbred trainer, competing at tracks such as Golden Gate Fields and Bay Meadows Racetrack in Northern California.

References

External links
 
 April 19, 2007 article on Pete Anderson by Jennie Rees in the Louisville Courier-Journal 

1931 births
People from Southampton (town), New York
American jockeys
American horse trainers
2013 deaths